Rune Brattsveen (born 5 April 1984) is a former Norwegian biathlete.

Life and career
Brattsveen was born in Dokka to mother Jorun, a librarian, and father Bjørn. He has one older sister Hege (b. 1980). He went to school in Dokka for ten years, before he started at Norges toppidrettsgymnas in Lillehammer at the age of 16. He currently resides in Lillehammer.

Brattsveen has many good placings in the Biathlon World Cup. He was a member of the Norwegian elite biathlon team from the 2008–09 season to the 2009–10 season, and again in the 2012–13 season. He did not, however, have any World Cup starts in the 2012–13 season because of the TWAR virus. Further illness meant no starts in the 2013–14 season either, and after that season Brattsveen decided to retire.

Distinctions

National distinctions
2001 – Sverre Kolteruds idrettspris – local and significant sport talents in Nordre Land
2008 – Sverre Kolteruds idrettspris 
2012 – Oppland Arbeiderblads idrettspris – awarded local talents within sports

References

External links
 

1984 births
Living people
People from Nordre Land
Norwegian male biathletes
Biathlon World Championships medalists
Sportspeople from Innlandet